Dalung is a town in the Badung Regency of Bali, Indonesia.

Populated places in Bali